Agilkia Island (also called Agilika; , from Old Nubian: ⲁ̅ⲅⲗ̅, romanised: agil, "mouth") is an island in the reservoir of the Old Aswan Dam along the Nile River in southern Egypt; it is the present site of the relocated ancient Egyptian temple complex of Philae. Partially to completely flooded by the old dam's construction in 1902, the Philae complex was dismantled and relocated to Agilkia island, as part of a wider UNESCO project related to the 1960s construction of the Aswan High Dam and the eventual flooding of many sites posed by its large reservoir upstream.

Agilkia, like the island, was the name chosen for the planned landing site on a comet by the Rosetta spacecraft mission's Philae lander. Upon initial touchdown however, the lander took a large bounce followed by a smaller one before finally coming to rest perhaps a kilometre away from Agilkia, at a site named Abydos, after the ancient Egyptian city.

References

External links

Sacred Temple Island of Philae
Philae @ The Domain of Het-Hert another alternative name for Hathor - aerial view of the temples
Philae @ Akhet Egyptology

Islands of the Nile
River islands of Egypt
Archaeological sites in Egypt
Philae
Relocated buildings and structures
Roman sites in Egypt
Tourism in Egypt
World Heritage Sites in Egypt